Dendrasteridae is a family of echinoderms belonging to the order Clypeasteroida.

Genera:
 Dendraster Agassiz, 1847
 Merriamaster
 Orchoporus

References

 
Clypeasteroida
Echinoderm families